Leïla Mezian Benjelloun is a Moroccan physician and businesswoman and the wife of billionaire Othman Benjelloun.

Early life
She is the daughter of Moroccan general Mohamed Meziane. She was born in Valencia and grew up in Spain. She is a graduate of the University of Madrid's medical school.

Career
She is president of the BMCE Bank Foundation.

In October 2017, she laid the foundation stone of the new 1200 m² Museum of Arts and Traditions of Morocco (MATM) that she is building at the junction of Moulay Youssef Boulevard and Roudani Boulevard in Casablanca. The building, designed by architect Tarik Oualalou, is 26 meters high and was budgeted to cost 79 million MAD. The building was completed in 2018.

She is president of the Alaouite Organization for the Protection of the Blind and the Moroccan Red Cross, vice president of the Association of Medical Doctors in Morocco, and president of the Benjelloun-Mezian Foundation.

On 2 November 2022, Leila won the Mediterranean Awards Awarded by the Foundation for the Three Cultures of the Mediterranean.

Personal life
She has been married to Othman Benjelloun since 1960, and they have two children; Dounia, a film producer, and Kamal, an anthropologist and environmentalist.

References

Living people
Moroccan businesspeople
Moroccan women in business
21st-century Moroccan physicians
People from Valencia
Year of birth missing (living people)